Brent Hill (born April 23, 1949) is an American politician and Certified Public Accountant who served as a member of the Idaho Senate from 2000 to 2020.

Early life and career
Born and raised in Idaho, he attended Sugar-Salem Schools and graduated as valedictorian from Madison High School. After attending Brigham Young University–Idaho, he graduated as the Outstanding Accounting Graduate from Utah State University in Logan, Utah.

Career 
He served over twenty years as the CEO of Rudd & Company CPA. Hill is a certified public accountant and certified financial planner.

Hill is a member of the Board of Directors of Citizens Community Bank with offices throughout Eastern Idaho. In 2001, Hill was elected to represent Idaho's 34th Legislative District which encompasses Madison and Fremont Counties.

On January 30, 2020, Hill announced his retirement from the State Senate to join the National Institute for Civil Discourse, where he will serve as the Next Generation Program Director.

Hill was elected by his fellow senators to be the President pro tempore in the 61st Idaho Legislature (2010–2012) and served in the position until he left office in 2020.

Personal life 
Hill is a native of Rexburg, Idaho. He and his wife, Julie Ann Slaugh, have four children and 20 grandchildren.

Committees

2009–10 session
 Agricultural Affairs
 Judiciary and Rules
 Local Government and Taxation

2011–12 session
 Judiciary and Rules
 Local Government and Taxation
 State Affairs

2013–14 session
 Local Government and Taxation 
 State Affairs

2015–16 session
 State Affairs
 Economic Outlook and Revenue Assessment

2017–18 session 
 State Affairs
 Local Government and Taxation

'''2019–20 session
 State Affairs
 Local Government and Taxation

Historical racing 
Hill is a named member of the Idaho United Against Prop 1 Political Action Committee (PAC), which was created to oppose Idaho Proposition 1 (2018). The PAC's treasurer is "Ernie" Stensgar, a member of the Coeur d'Alene tribe. In 2015, tribal representatives testified during Idaho Senate and House State Affairs committee hearings that they were worried that historical racing terminals at racetracks would negatively impact their own tribal casino revenues.

References

External links 
 Brent Hill at ballotpedia.org

1949 births
21st-century American politicians
Republican Party Idaho state senators
Latter Day Saints from Idaho
Living people
People from Rigby, Idaho
Utah State University alumni